The 1935 Yazidi revolt took place in Iraq in October 1935. The Iraqi government, under Yasin al-Hashimi, crushed a revolt by the Yazidi people of Jabal Sinjar against the imposition of conscription. The Iraqi army, led by Bakr Sidqi, reportedly killed over 200 Yazidi and imposed martial law throughout the region. Parallel revolts opposing conscription also broke out that year in the northern (Kurdish populated) and mid-Euphrates (majorly Shia populated) regions of Iraq.

The Yazidis of Jabal Sinjar constituted the majority of Iraqi Yazidi population - the third largest non-Muslim minority within the kingdom. In 1939, the region of Jabal Sinjar was once again put under military control, together with the Shekhan District.

See also 
List of modern conflicts in the Middle East
1935–1936 Iraqi Shia revolts
Yazidi genocide

References

1935 in Iraq
Conflicts in 1935
Yazidis in Iraq
October 1935 events
Yazidi history